Cwm-y-Glo railway station served the village of Cwm-y-glo, Gwynedd, Wales, at the north-west end of Llyn Padarn. The station was closed for regular passenger services in 1930 but trains passed through until September 1964.

The station lay on the nine mile LNWR branch line between Caernarfon and Llanberis which was established by the Caernarvon and Llanberis Railway Act 1864.

The Summer 1939 Working timetable shows that some excursions made unadvertised stops at the station.

The station was demolished in the 1970s when the realigned A4086 was built along the trackbed. A Public House called the Railway Inn is all that remains of the station as was, this pub is now known as Y Fricsan.

References

Sources

Further material

External links
 The station on a navigable OS Map in National Library of Scotland
 The station and line in Rail Map Online
 The station and line in Rail Chronology

Railway stations in Great Britain opened in 1869
Railway stations in Great Britain closed in 1930
Former London and North Western Railway stations
Disused railway stations in Gwynedd
Llanrug